Palaeomyrmidon is an extinct genus of anteater.  Its closest living relative is the silky anteater (Cyclopes didactylus).  Although the silky anteater is arboreal, Palaeomyrmidon lived on the ground. Palaeomyrmidon is known from a fossil skull that was found in the Andalhualá Formation of Argentina.

References 

Anteaters
Miocene xenarthrans
Pliocene xenarthrans
Prehistoric monotypic mammal genera
Miocene mammals of South America
Pliocene mammals of South America
Chapadmalalan
Montehermosan
Neogene Argentina
Fossils of Argentina
Fossil taxa described in 1914